Martin Greeley (March 16, 1814 - September 4, 1899) was an American farmer and politician.

Born in Palermo, Maine, he came to Minnesota Territory in 1856. He was a farmer and merchant and lived in Maine Prairie, Minnesota. He went to St. Cloud Normal School (St. Cloud State University). Greeley served in the Minnesota House of Representatives in 1872 and in 1889 and 1890.

Notes

1814 births
1899 deaths
People from Palermo, Maine
People from Stearns County, Minnesota
St. Cloud State University alumni
Businesspeople from Minnesota
Members of the Minnesota House of Representatives
Farmers from Minnesota
19th-century American politicians